Julie Halard-Decugis and Ai Sugiyama were the defending champions but only Sugiyama competed that year with Nicole Arendt.

Arendt and Sugiyama lost in the first round to Kristie Boogert and Miriam Oremans.

Arantxa Sánchez Vicario and Nathalie Tauziat won in the final 6–0, 6–4 against Lisa Raymond and Rennae Stubbs.

Seeds
Champion seeds are indicated in bold text while text in italics indicates the round in which those seeds were eliminated.

Draw

Final

Top half

Bottom half

Qualifying

Seeds

Qualifiers
  Nannie de Villiers /  Annabel Ellwood

Qualifying draw

References
 Official results archive (ITF)
 Official results archive (WTA)

2001 Ericsson Open
Ericsson Open - Women's Doubles